Eratini is a village in the southern part of Phocis, Greece. It was the municipal seat of the municipality of Tolofon. Eratini is situated on the Gulf of Corinth, 14 km west of Galaxidi, 19 km south of Lidoriki, 23 km southwest of Amfissa and 35 km east of Nafpaktos. The Greek National Road 48 (Antirrio - Nafpaktos - Delphi - Livadeia) passes through the village. In 2011, Erateini had a population of 856.

Population

External links
 Erateini GTP Travel Pages

See also

List of settlements in Phocis

References

Populated places in Phocis